Christoph Alex (born 18 February 1986), better known as Favorite, is a German rapper and songwriter. In 2011, his album Christoph Alex peaked at number 4 in the German charts.

Biography
At age of 12, Favorite lost his parents in a fire and lived several years in different orphanages. The loss of his parents is a theme in many of Favorite's songs such as: "Gegen den Herrn" ("Against the lord") (released on Harlekin) and the single "Ich vermisse euch" ("I miss you").

Discography
 2007: Harlekin
 2008: Anarcho
 2011: Christoph Alex
 2015: Neues von Gott
 2017: Alternative für Deutschland

References

German rappers
Living people
1986 births
Musicians from Essen